The S(ex) Tapes is the third extended play by American pop singer Fletcher, released on September 9, 2020, via Capitol Records.  

Four singles were released from The S(ex) Tapes: "Bitter", "If I Hated You", "Feel" and "The One".

Track listing

References

External links
 

2020 EPs
Albums produced by Malay (record producer)
Capitol Records EPs
Fletcher (singer) EPs